Xihe (西河村) is a small village in the Gong'an County of Hubei in China. It had a population of 390 and an elevation 34m

References 

Village-level divisions of Hubei
Jingzhou